Liliana Cîrstea (born 7 August 1962) is a Romanian diver. She competed in the women's 3 metre springboard event at the 1980 Summer Olympics.

References

1962 births
Living people
Romanian female divers
Olympic divers of Romania
Divers at the 1980 Summer Olympics
Place of birth missing (living people)
Competitors at the 1981 Summer Universiade